Springfield Boulevard  is a major north/south roadway that runs through the eastern section of Queens, New York. Springfield Boulevard runs through Bayside, Oakland Gardens, Queens Village, Cambria Heights, Laurelton, Springfield Gardens and along the eastern border of St. Albans. The name "Springfield," derived from the Springfield Armory, is one of several firearms-oriented street names in the area. This is the result of the National Rifle Range having been situated on the grounds of what is now Creedmoor State Hospital during the 19th and early 20th centuries.  

The north end of Springfield Boulevard is a simple two-way two lane street in southeastern Bayside.  It gradually gets wider as it heads towards Springfield Gardens.  At some time the city widened Springfield Boulevard in Queens Village from 112th Avenue to Jamaica Avenue, in character with its name as a "Boulevard".  South of Jamaica Avenue, it gains a strip median used as a turning lane for intersections, and south of 112th Avenue all the way to 147th Avenue, it gains a median divider. The Q1, Q2, Q27, Q77, Q83, Q85 and Q88 bus lines all serve Springfield Boulevard.

Springfield Boulevard intersects with many major roads including Northern Boulevard, Union Turnpike, Hillside Avenue, Jamaica Avenue, Hempstead Avenue, Linden Boulevard, Francis Lewis Boulevard and Merrick Boulevard. At its southern end, Springfield Boulevard once continued to Rockaway Boulevard; however, frequent flooding led to that stretch being closed. The land there has been developed into a distribution center.

Many high schools are located near Springfield Boulevard, including Springfield Gardens High School, Martin Van Buren High School, and Benjamin Cardozo High School.  Queensborough Community College is also located fairly close to Springfield Boulevard in Bayside.

References

Streets in Queens, New York